Sir Ian Charles Athfield  (15 July 1940 – 16 January 2015) was a New Zealand architect. He was born in Christchurch and graduated from the University of Auckland in 1963 with a Diploma of Architecture. That same year he joined Structon Group Architects, and he became a partner in 1965. In 1968 he was a principal partner in setting up Athfield Architects with Ian Dickson and Graeme John Boucher (Manson). Athfield died in 2015 due to complications from a routine procedure which resulted in pneumonia, at the Wellington Hospital, where he was being treated for prostate cancer.

Projects 

In 1965 Athfield started work on his first major project, Athfield House, for his family and a studio. Located in Khandallah, Wellington, this distinctive group of structures stands out amongst neighbouring conventional suburban houses. His early projects were constructed with a broad palette of materials including corrugated iron, plaster, stainless steel and fibre glass. As a reaction to much of the bland "Modern" architecture of the period, Athfield built in a deliberately vernacular style using features harking back to colonial buildings. His designs incorporated finials, steeply pitched roofs, timber weatherboards, verandahs and double hung windows. He was also inspired by the architecture of the Greek Islands with their exterior envelopes of continuous plaster and small windows. Conversely, he also much admired the buildings of Mies van der Rohe with their precise and refined detailing of industrial materials.

Yet another area of influence for Athfield was the geometric massing of the Japanese Metabolists. Athfield combined all these disparate elements into a highly eclectic and personal style. During the 1970s Athfield built and renovated numerous domestic houses and buildings, developing a distinctive and highly personal design approach based on the repetition of small scale elements and complex massing. Critical opposition to these 'cartoon houses' did not bother him (Manson). Another criticism of Athfield's houses were that they were built for charm and not practicality. Athfield believed, however, that "in a house, you should get a surprise every time you turn a corner and look up" (Manson).

Athfield's practice expanded during the 1980s from mainly residential work to a wider variety of community and commercial buildings. As well as continuing to work on small-scale projects, his portfolio includes churches, pubs, council flats, stadiums and commercial high-rise buildings. Athfield's best known works include Telecom Towers, Civic Square and Wellington Central Library, Jade Stadium in Christchurch and work on the design of the Bangkok rapid transport system.

He was a President of the New Zealand Institute of Architects, judged many design competitions and was a keynote speaker at many overseas conferences. His firm's later projects included Chews Lane Precinct, the Wellington Overseas Passenger Terminal redevelopment and the Wellington Marine Education Centre.

A documentary on Athfield, Architect of Dreams, was produced for the NZ Documentary Festival.

Following the Canterbury earthquakes of 2010 and 2011, Athfield was appointed as an Architectural Ambassador to Christchurch.

Awards and honours
Athfield won over 60 national and international architecture and design awards. In 1976 he won first prize in the International Competition for the Urban Environment of Developing Countries. In 1978 he was placed first equal in a Low Cost Housing Design Competition in Fiji. He won 13 NZIA Supreme Awards for his outstanding architectural projects. In 2004 he won the New Zealand Institute of Architects' highest honour, the Gold Medal. Athfield was the first New Zealand architect to register as an APEC architect.

Athfield was awarded the New Zealand 1990 Commemoration Medal. In the 1996 Queen's Birthday Honours, he was appointed a Companion of the New Zealand Order of Merit, for services to architecture, and in the 2015 New Year Honours he was promoted to Knight Companion of the same order.

He received a Distinguished Alumni Award in 1997 from the University of Auckland, and in 2000 he was awarded an honorary LitD by Victoria University of Wellington. Accepting his honorary doctorate on 18 April, Athfield stated:

I accept this on behalf of architects, designers, plumbers and gas fitters. We have suffered at the hands of accountants and engineers for too long.

Notable works

 Athfield House, Wellington (begun 1968)
 Arlington Council Flats, Wellington (1970) (demolished 2021)
 Logan House (1974–75)
 Cox House, Wellington (1975)
 Manila, Philippines housing project competition (1975–76)
 Porteous House (1979)
 Buck House, Te Mata Estate, Hawkes Bay (1980)
 First Church of Christ Science, Wellington (1982–83)
 Moore Wilson's facade, Wellington (1984)
 Logical CSI House, Wellington (1986–87)
 226 Oriental Parade, Wellington (1988)
 Telecom on Manners Street, Wellington (1988)
 Wellington City Library, Wellington (1991)
 Civic Square, Wellington (1992)
 Extensions to Student Union building, Victoria University of Wellington (1992)
 Palmerston North City Library extensions (1997)
 Sam Neill House, Queenstown (1998)
 Rooftop additions to Te Puni Kōkiri House, Wellington (1998–99)
 Adam Art Gallery, Victoria University of Wellington (1999)
 Alan Duff House (2000)
 St Pauls Apartments, Wellington (2000)
 Lancaster Park extensions, Christchurch (with Architectus, 2002)
 Odlins Building/NZX refurbishment, Wellington (2005)
 TheNewDowse Museum, Lower Hutt, Wellington (2006)
 Chews Lane Precinct, Wellington (2009)
 Taranaki Street Wharf, Wellington (begun 2006)
 Selwyn District Council offices, Canterbury (2007)
 Pipitea House, Wellington (2011; headquarters of the GCSB)
 Wellington Marine Education Centre (proposed, denied by the Environment Court in 2007 on appeal; new location proposed)
 1-8 Clyde Quay Wharf (officially opened on Wednesday, 18 June 2014), Wellington - formerly the Overseas Passenger Terminal
 Tommy Millions pizza kiosk on Courtenay Place, Wellington
 Kate Sheppard Exchange, Wellington (proposed)
 109 Featherston Street, Wellington (proposed)

See also
 Roger Walker
 Miles Warren

References

External links

 Athfield Architects
 Documentary of Ian Athfield on NZ On Screen. Made in 1977 after winning International competition to design housing in Manila
 The Wellingtonian interview: Ian Athfield, 25 June 2009

1940 births
2015 deaths
20th-century New Zealand architects
University of Auckland alumni
Knights Companion of the New Zealand Order of Merit
People from Christchurch
21st-century New Zealand architects
Recipients of the NZIA Gold Medal